The Cathedral of the Holy Redeemer is the main church of the Roman Catholic Diocese of Multan, Pakistan. Father Shahzad Niamat was the cathedral parish priest, and Father Shakeel John the assistant in 2008.

Recent history

On October 25, 1990, about 2,000 people participated in the golden jubilee celebration of Multan diocese at Holy Redeemer Cathedral.

There was great rejoicing in the cathedral on 8 December 2004 as Bishop Andrew Francis ordained six priests of the diocese.

On 23 September 2007 at the Holy Redeemer Cathedral, about 1,000 Catholics gathered to watch the official inauguration of the Padre Pio Health Centre on the cathedral grounds.

Besides the usual liturgical events, the cathedral hosts national and international events. On 6 June 2008, about 120 priests, nuns, youth leaders and other laypeople from Multan diocese's 18 parishes attended the local Catholic Church's first Diocesan Mission Congress (DMC). This was the first follow-up of the Asian Mission Congress that took place in Thailand from October 18–22, 2006.

During a visit to the Cathedral in April 2012, the Minister for National Harmony Dr Paul Bhatti lauded the design of the cathedral which is rich with symbols of interfaith harmony.

In March 2020, Bishop Benny Mario Travas of Multan distributed COVID-19 emergency kits to the parish staff of the cathedral parish. The Church is making every attempt to encourage people to stay safe during the pandemic by following the guidelines of the local authorities.

References

1940 establishments in British India
Multan
Buildings and structures in Multan
Religion in Punjab, Pakistan